The 1904 Navy Midshipmen football team represented the United States Naval Academy during the 1904 college football season. In their first season under head coach Paul Dashiell, the Midshipmen compiled a 7–2–1 record, shut out six opponents, and outscored all opponents by a combined score of 149 to 38.

Schedule

References

Navy
Navy Midshipmen football seasons
Navy Midshipmen football